The Catholic Church in the Gambia and Sierra Leone, two Anglophone (ex-British) West African countries, is composed solely of a Latin hierarchy, comprising :
 one ecclesiastical province, covering all and only Sierra Leone, comprising the Metropolitan of capital Freetown and three suffragan dioceses. 
 an exempt diocese (directly dependent on the Holy See) for all the Gambia, with see in its capital Banjul.

There are no Eastern Catholic or pre-diocesan jurisdictions or overlapping ordinariates.

Neither country has a national Episcopal Conference, but they form a joint one for the Gambia and Sierra Leone, which hosts it in Freetown. 

There are no titular sees. All defunct jurisdictions are precursors of present sees.

There formally is an Apostolic Nunciature (embassy-level papal diplomatic representation) to Sierra Leone and an Apostolic Nunciature to The Gambia, but both are vested in the Apostolic Nunciature to Liberia (in its capital Monrovia).

Current Latin dioceses

In The Gambia 
 Exempt Roman Catholic Diocese of Banjul

In Sierra Leone : Ecclesiastical Province of Freetown 
 Metropolitan Roman Catholic Archdiocese of Freetown
 Roman Catholic Diocese of Kenema
 Roman Catholic Diocese of Makeni
 Roman Catholic Diocese of Bo.

See also 
 List of Catholic dioceses (structured view)
 Catholic Church in the Gambia
 Catholic Church in Sierra Leone

References

Sources and external links 
 GCatholic - Episcopal conference
 GCatholic.org - Gambia
 GCatholic.org - Senegal.
 Catholic-Hierarchy entry.

Sierra Leone